Rheum nobile, the Sikkim rhubarb or noble rhubarb or पदमचाल, is a giant herbaceous plant native to the Himalaya, from northeastern Afghanistan, east through northern Pakistan and India, Nepal, Sikkim (in India), Bhutan, and Tibet to Myanmar, occurring in the alpine zone at 4000–4800 m altitude.

It is an extraordinary species of rhubarb (genus Rheum). At 1–2 m tall, the monocarpic inflorescences of R. nobile tower above the other shrubs and low herbs in its habitat, and it is visible across valleys a mile away.

R. nobile is often called a glasshouse plant because of its outer curtain of translucent bracts which pass visible light, creating a greenhouse effect, while blocking ultraviolet radiation. These are likely defenses against the increased UV-B exposure and extreme cold in its high altitude range.

Description
An individual R. nobile is a conical tower of delicate, straw-coloured, shining, translucent, regularly overlapping bracts; the higher ones have pink edges. Large, glossy, green radicle leaves, with red petioles and nerves, form a broad base to the plant. Turning up the bracts reveals membranous, fragile, pink stipules. Within these are short branched panicles of diminutive green flowers.

After flowering, the stem lengthens and the bracts separate one from another, turning a coarse red-brown. As the fruit ripens, the bracts fall away, leaving a ragged-looking stem covered with panicles of deep brown pendulous fruits. As Hooker put their appearance: "In the winter, these naked black stems, projecting from the beetling cliffs, or towering above the snow, are in dismal keeping with the surrounding desolation of that season."

Karyotypy
R. nobile has a chromosome count of 2n=22.

Bracts

The bracts of R. nobile are 110-170 µm thick and do not differentiate into palisade and spongy layers. They selectively block ultraviolet radiation while letting almost all visible light through; thus the developing flowers and the apical meristem are protected from the intense radiation found in high altitudes. The major UV blockers found in the bracts are all quercetin flavonoids:
Rutin, quercetin 3-O-rutinoside: widespread in higher plants and previously reported in leaves and petioles of other Rheum species
Guaijaverin, quercetin 3-O-arabinoside: first report in Rheum
Hyperin, quercetin 3-O-galactoside: widespread in plants and previously reported in leaves and petioles of R. rhaponticum
Isoquercitrin, quercetin 3-O-glucoside: widespread in plants and previously reported in leaves and petioles of R. rhaponticum
Quercetin 3-O-[6″-(3-hydroxy-3-methylglutaroyl)-glucoside]: first finding in nature

Minor UV blockers include quercetin 7-O-glycoside, quercetin itself, kaempferol glycoside, and feruloyl ester.

Edibility
The stems are pleasantly acidic, and they are consumed by the local people, who call the plant Chuka. The hollow of the stem contains a good deal of limpid water.

History

A description of R. nobile was first published by Joseph Dalton Hooker and Thomas Thomson in 1855. Hooker wrote:
"The present is certainly the most striking of the many fine alpine plants of Sikkim; and though in every botanical character, as also in the acid juice of the stem, a genuine Rhubarb, it differs so remarkably in habit and general appearance from any of its congeners, that at first sight it could not be recognized as one of them. I first saw it from a distance of fully a mile, dotting the black cliffs of the Lachen valley at  elevation, in inaccessible situations, and was quite at a loss to conceive what it could be; not was it till I had turned back the curious bracteal leaves and examined the flowers that I was persuaded of its being a true Rhubarb."

References

Notes

External links 

 Plants For A Future
 Photos by Thomas Kornack

nobile
Flora of Tibet
Flora of Myanmar
Flora of the Indian subcontinent